Sarashi is a rural locality (a selo) and the administrative center of Sarashevskoye Rural Settlement, Bardymsky District, Perm Krai, Russia. The population was 1,446 as of 2010. There are 31 streets.

Geography 
Sarashi is located on the Sarashka River, 38 km southeast of Barda (the district's administrative centre) by road. Krasnoyar-1 is the nearest rural locality.

References 

Rural localities in Bardymsky District